Sidney Robinson or Sydney Robinson may refer to:

 Sidney Robinson (politician) (1863–1956), Liberal Party politician in Wales, MP from 1906 to 1922
 Sidney Robinson (athlete) (1876–1959), British middle-distance athlete who specialised in the steeplechase
 Sydney Robinson (trade unionist) (1905-1978), British trade union leader
 Sydney Walter Robinson (1876–1950), English farmer, building contractor and Liberal Party politician
 Sidney Cecil Robinson (1870–1943), Conservative member of the Canadian House of Commons